Kashubian Landscape Park is a Landscape Park, a Polish protected area classification, in northern Poland. It represents the natural landscape of and is named after the historic Kashubian culture that existed in this region.

Geography

The Park lies within Pomeranian Voivodeship: in Kartuzy County (Gmina Kartuzy, Gmina Chmielno, Gmina Sierakowice, Gmina Somonino), Wejherowo County (Gmina Linia), and Kościerzyna County (Gmina Kościerzyna, Gmina Nowa Karczma).

Nature reserves
Within the Kashubian Landscape Park are 12 distinct nature reserves.

Literature
 Gdańsk : "Marpress", 2000 .

References

See also
Kashubians
List of Landscape Parks of Poland
Protected areas of Poland

Kashubian
Kashubians
Kashubia
Parks in Pomeranian Voivodeship